Cree or Creegh is a small village in County Clare in Ireland. It is situated at a crossroads near the villages of Doonbeg and Cooraclare in the west of the county. In Dromheilly Cree there is a holy shrine located which every year in August has a week of masses that people from west Clare attend. Cree is in the ecclesiastical parish of Cree/Cooraclare parish and in the Roman Catholic Diocese of Killaloe. Nearby villages and small towns include Cooraclare, Doonbeg, Mullagh, Quilty, Kilmihil, Kilkee and Milltown Malbay.

History 
In the 15th and 16th centuries the land in Clare was divided into baronies. Cree comes from the Irish word Críoch meaning the end, which was because the village was situated at the border of one of these baronies Ibrickane and Corca Bhaiscin.

Amenities 
Serving the area is a Catholic Church( Saint Mary's) one public house, a fast food restaurant, two primary schools (Cree and Clohanbeg), a preschool, a community centre, a garage, a hair and beauty business and a shop/deli. Clean Ireland Recycling's headquarters are located in Cree. There are several guest houses and bed & breakfast located in Cree and vicinity.

Geography 
Most of the people living around Cree are involved in agriculture and the majority of the land is used for dairy farming. The Creegh River flows through the village and enters the Atlantic Ocean at Doughmore Bay near Doonbeg.

People
 Patrick Kelly (1905–1976), fiddle player
 Patrick Kelly (1875–1934), politician, was born in nearby Clonina

See also
 List of towns and villages in Ireland

References

Towns and villages in County Clare